The Ordeal of Dr. Shannon is a 1962 American television adaptation from A. J. Cronin's 1948 novel, Shannon's Way. The dramatization was written by Robert Stewart, directed by Joan Kemp-Welch, and produced by Lewis Freedman.  The show was the ninth episode of the second season of The DuPont Show of the Week, which was broadcast on NBC, and it starred Rod Taylor and Elizabeth MacLennan.  In 1963, it was broadcast in Great Britain on ITV Television Playhouse.

The episode was filmed on location in Britain over two weeks. It was the first co-production between a regular American TV dramatic series and a production company from another country (in this case, England).

Cast

Rod Taylor as Robert Shannon
Elizabeth MacLennan as Jean Law
Alan Casley as the Policeman
Madeleine Christie as Mrs. Law
Finlay Currie as Sir Wilfred Challis
Archie Duncan as Reverend Law
Hugh Evans as Malcolm Hodden
Ronald Fraser as Dr. James Mathers
Betty Henderson as Mrs. Maclaren
Moultrie Kelsall as Dr. Usher
Frank Olegario as Chattergee

References

External links 

 

1962 American television series debuts
1960s American drama television series
1960s American medical television series
Television shows based on British novels
Television shows based on works by A. J. Cronin
British medical television series
NBC original programming